Migraleve is the brand name of a range of migraine-relief medications made by Pfizer.

There are two variants of Migraleve: Yellow and pink, which both contain the analgesics paracetamol and codeine. The yellow variant is designed to address the symptoms of headache and discomfort, whilst the pink variant also addresses symptoms of nausea and vomiting. A third Migraleve variant, Migraleve Ultra, contains sumatriptan.

The pink tablet is supposed to be taken before the yellow tablet.

Migraleve Pink
The active ingredients of Migraleve Pink are:
 paracetamol DC 96% 520 mg equivalent to paracetamol 500 mg, codeine phosphate 8 mg and buclizine hydrochloride 6.25 mg.

Other ingredients: magnesium stearate, colloidal anhydrous silica, stearic acid, pregelatinised maize starch, gelatin, hypromellose, macrogol, E127 (erythrosine), aluminium oxide and E171 (titanium dioxide).

Migraleve Yellow
The active ingredients of Migraleve Yellow are:
 paracetamol DC 96% 520 mg equivalent to paracetamol 500 mg and codeine phosphate 8 mg.

Other ingredients: magnesium stearate, colloidal anhydrous silica, stearic acid, pregelatinised maize starch, gelatin, hypromellose, macrogol, E104 (quinoline yellow), aluminium oxide, E171 (titanium dioxide) and E172 (iron oxide yellow).

Migraleve Ultra
The active ingredient of Migraleve Ultra is 50 mg sumatriptan, similar to Imigran recovery.

License and manufacture
The Product Licence Holder is: Pfizer Consumer Healthcare, Walton-on-the-Hill, Surrey, KT20 7NS 

The manufacturer is: Gödecke GmbH, Mooswaldallee 1, 79090, Freiburg, Germany.

References

External links
Migraleve home page

Antimigraine drugs
Analgesics
Antiemetics